Pompilini is a tribe of spider wasps in the family Pompilidae. There are about 18 genera and at least 50 described species in Pompilini.

Genera
These 18 genera belong to the tribe Pompilini:

 Agenioideus Ashmead, 1902 c g b
 Allochares Banks, 1917 c g b
 Ammosphex Wilcke, 1942 c g b
 Anoplius Dufour, 1834 i c g b (blue-black spider wasps)
 Anoplochares b
 Aporinellus Banks, 1911 c g b
 Arachnospila Kincaid, 1900 c g b
 Chalcochares Banks, 1917 c g b
 Episyron Schiödte, 1837 i c g b
 Evagetes Lepeletier, 1845 c g b
 Hesperopompilus b
 Paracyphononyx Gribodo, 1884 c g b
 Perissopompilus b
 Poecilopompilus Ashmead, 1902 c g b
 Tachypompilus Ashmead, 1902 i c g b
 Tastiotenia Evans, 1950 c g b
 Xenopompilus Evans, 1954 c g b
 Xerochares Evans, 1951 c g b

Data sources: i = ITIS, c = Catalogue of Life, g = GBIF, b = Bugguide.net

References

Further reading

External links

 

Pompilinae